Glenrothes North, Leslie and Markinch is one of the 22 wards used to elect members of the Fife council. It elects four Councillors.

Councillors

Election Results

2022 Election
2022 Fife Council election

2017 Election
2017 Fife Council election

2013 By-election
A by-election was called after William Kay died.

2012 Election
2012 Fife Council election

2007 Election
2007 Fife Council election

References

Wards of Fife
Glenrothes